"Crashing Around You" is a song by American heavy metal band Machine Head from their album Supercharger. It was released as a single in September 2001 and is also available on the band's live album Hellalive. The single's release was ill-timed, coming out shortly before the 9/11 terrorist attacks.

Music video
The video was released just barely before the 9/11 terrorist attacks. The imagery in the video focused around a disturbed man in a small room and the band playing in front of a backdrop which switches back and forth between a city skyline and flames, with the flames superimposed over the skyline towards the end of the video. In fear that this could be viewed as insensitive after the tragic 9/11 attacks, the music video was subsequently banned from MTV due to its depiction of falling buildings. The video can be seen as an enhanced feature on the actual single and on YouTube.

Track listing

Charts

References

2001 singles
2001 songs
Machine Head (band) songs
Songs written by Robb Flynn
Roadrunner Records singles
Songs written by Adam Duce
Songs written by Dave McClain (drummer)
Songs written by Ahrue Luster
Song recordings produced by Johnny K